This page details the rolling stock on the Manx Electric Railway on the Isle of Man, which is unique insofar as the railway still operates with its original tramcars and trailers, all of which are over one hundred years old, the latest dating from 1906. Save for a fire in 1930 in which several cars and trailers were lost, all of the line's original rolling stock remains extant, though many items have been out of use for a number of years, largely due to the decrease in tourism on the island over the last thirty years. Despite this, members of each class are still represented on site today, though not all are in original form or in regular use.

Motors

Trailers

Others

 Bertie 
 a contractors' locomotive used when relays were being undertaken, since moved to UK.

 Bungle & Zippy 
 hired second-hand from Bord na Móna in 2008 and refurbished on-island for further use on the railway, since returned to UK.

 Bonner Wagons 
 road-rail dual purpose wagons dating from the earliest days of the line, none of which are extant today.

 Aachen 1010 
 a Talbot/Kiepe bogie car from Aachen’s series 1001-1011, built in 1956-1957 and retired in 1974; bought for use but never converted, spending much of its life as a storage car at the railway's depot.

 Lisbon 360

 Dreadnought Trailers 
 bogie open wagons with removable sides used for a variety of non-passenger purposes, but particularly associated with stone traffic from Dhoon Quarry, now all scrapped.  General 12 ton capacity bogie vehicles.

 Four Wheel Goods Vehicles
 from 1894 onwards the Douglas and Laxey Electric Tramway and its successors operated a fleet of small four wheel goods wagons, mainly of 5 ton, and 6 ton capacity.  There were a total of ten opens and eight vans built by Milnes, Milnes Voss, and the MERCo between 1894 and 1912.  Some of the vans were painted red and used for mail traffic.

See also
Heritage railways in the Isle of Man
Transport on the Isle of Man
Manx Electric Railway

References

 
 
 
 
 
 
 
 

Manx Electric Railway
Heritage railways in the Isle of Man
3 ft gauge railways in the Isle of Man

da:Manx Electric Railway
de:Manx Electric Railway
fr:Chemin de fer électrique mannois
sv:Manx elektriska järnväg